Chaleh (also Romanized as Chāleh; also known as Chāla) is a village in Alamut-e Bala Rural District, Rudbar-e Alamut District, Qazvin County, Qazvin Province, Iran. At the 2006 census, its population was 208, in 66 families.

References 

Populated places in Qazvin County